Edward Bennett Williams (May 31, 1920 – August 13, 1988) was an American lawyer who became a high-profile defense lawyer and co-founded the law firm of Williams & Connolly. Williams also owned several professional sports teams, including the Baltimore Orioles. He was born in Hartford, Connecticut, and received his undergraduate degree from the College of the Holy Cross. Williams studied law at Georgetown University.

Career in law 
Williams represented many high-profile clients, including Sam Giancana, John Hinckley, Jr., Frank Sinatra, former Governor of Texas & Secretary of the Treasury John B. Connally, Jr., financier Robert Vesco, Playboy publisher Hugh Hefner, spy Igor Melekh, Jimmy Hoffa, organized crime figure Frank Costello, oil commodity trader Marc Rich, U.S. Senator Joseph McCarthy, corporate raider Victor Posner, Michael Milken, The Washington Post newspaper, the Reverend Sun Myung Moon, former CIA director Richard Helms, Bobby Baker, The Washington Post, various FBI agents accused of bag jobs in New York, and Aldo Icardi, an OSS agent accused of killing his commander.

Williams, who was a graduate of the College of the Holy Cross and Georgetown University Law Center, successfully defended—among others—Adam Clayton Powell, Jr., the Teamsters Union, John Connally and, as one of his last clients, Michael Milken.

Two of Williams' closest friends were The Washington Post'''s Art Buchwald and Ben Bradlee. His debating team partner at Holy Cross was Robert Maheu, Howard Hughes's right-hand man for many years.

Before establishing Williams & Connolly in 1967 with his friend and student Paul Connolly, he worked at the prominent D.C.-based law firm of Hogan & Hartson from 1945 to 1949.

 Deep Throat 
In one of the definitive biographies on Williams, author Evan Thomas wrote: "Because of his connections and his vast store of inside knowledge, some observers speculated that he was Deep Throat, the legendary source for Bob Woodward and Carl Bernstein, the Washington Post reporters who broke the story tying the White House to the break-in. It was later revealed that the anonymous source known as Deep Throat was FBI associate director Mark Felt.

 Professional sports 
Williams entered the world of professional sports as a lawyer for Washington Redskins founding owner George Preston Marshall in the late 1950s. He ascended the administrative ranks by purchasing a five percent share in the franchise in March 1962 and succeeding the ailing Marshall as team president in charge of daily operations three years later in 1965. After Marshall's death in 1970, Williams bought controlling interest in the Redskins from the Marshall estate.

Williams spent heavily on appointing high-profile coaches and general managers, beginning with Otto Graham in 1966 and continuing with Vince Lombardi in 1969, George Allen in 1971 and Bobby Beathard in 1978. A defeat in Super Bowl VII was the farthest the Redskins ever advanced in any of the seasons under Williams's watch. When Jack Kent Cooke bought controlling interest in 1974, William remained team president and operating head of the franchise until 1980 and remained part-owner until 1985.White, Joseph. "Redskins owner Jack Kent Cooke dies," The Associated Press (AP), Sunday, April 6, 1997. Retrieved August 10, 2019

Williams acquired controlling interest in the Baltimore Orioles from Jerold Hoffberger for $12 million on August 2, 1979, with the transaction being approved unanimously by American League team owners  weeks later on October 22. His interest in purchasing the franchise began when he represented in negotiations William E. Simon, who had attempted to do the same thing earlier that year until he withdrew his offer on February 5.Scannell, Nancy. "Simon Withdraws Offer for Orioles," The Washington Post, Tuesday, February 6, 1979. Retrieved December 12, 2020 As part of the deal, Williams bought a block of publicly traded shares that had been issued in 1936 when the team was still the St. Louis Browns, making the Orioles privately held once again.

Many feared Williams would move the team to Washington. Baltimore had previously lost the Baltimore Bullets to Washington. The fear of Williams's moving the team increased with the 1984 departure of the Baltimore Colts. However, Williams never moved the team. More importantly, Williams signed a new, long-term lease with Baltimore that would pay for a new stadium, which would become Oriole Park at Camden Yards. He would not live to see the new ballpark (it opened in 1992, four years after his death). The Orioles were sold by Williams's wife Agnes to Eli Jacobs, Larry Lucchino and Sargent and Bobby Shriver for $70 million on December 5, 1988, just under four months after his death.

 Real estate investments 
Among Williams's many real estate holdings was the Jefferson Hotel, a 98-room luxury hotel located near the White House and favored by many sport and political figures in the 1980s/1990s. In April 1989, Paine Webber Realty (a subsidiary of the Paine Webber stock brokerage firm) purchased the hotel from Agnes Williams for $28 million ($ in  dollars).

Death/funeral
Williams died at Georgetown University Hospital, aged 68, on August 13, 1988, after a 12-year battle with colon cancer. His funeral was attended by most of Washington's power elite, including then-Vice President George H. W. Bush. His body was buried in St. Gabriel Cemetery in Potomac, Maryland.

In a final testament to Williams’s reach and influence, his funeral was attended by an exceptionally wide range of the famous and infamous, including Supreme Court Justice Thurgood Marshall, baseball legend Joe DiMaggio, boxing champion Sugar Ray Leonard, NFL commissioner Pete Rozelle, Eunice Kennedy and Sargent Shriver, and Michael Milken (of the famous 1980s junk-bond scandal).  In the words of biographer Evan Thomas, “[O]ver two thousand mourners had gathered, filling the immense nave and spilling out onto the street which was lined with black limousines. Senators and Supreme Court justices, felons and bookmakers, waiters and doormen, billionaires, professional ball players, and Georgetown society jammed under the domed ceiling to sit before the plain mahogany casket.”

Honors
The Edward Bennett Williams Law Library at Georgetown University Law Center is named in his honor. The senior apartments residence hall at the College of the Holy Cross is also named in his honor.

Personal life
Edward Bennett Williams married Dorothy Guider in 1949. They had three children: Joseph, Ellen, and Bennett.  Guider died in 1959. In June 1960, Williams married Agnes Neill and had four children: Edward, Dana, Anthony, and Kimberly. Agnes Neill Williams worked as an attorney for the Williams & Connolly law firm and served on the Board of Advisors of the Georgetown Center for Liturgy. She died on March 4, 2020.

References

 Thomas, Evan. The Man to See, 1991.
 Williams, Edward Bennett. One Man's Freedom''.
 Hilzenrath, David S. (April 4, 1989). "Paine Webber Realty to Buy Jefferson Hotel". The Washington Post. p. C1

External links
 Edward Bennett Williams
 

1920 births
1988 deaths
Baltimore Orioles owners
Major League Baseball owners
Lawyers from Washington, D.C.
Georgetown University Law Center alumni
College of the Holy Cross alumni
People from Bethesda, Maryland
Lawyers from Hartford, Connecticut
Deaths from cancer in Washington, D.C.
20th-century American lawyers
Washington Redskins owners
Democratic National Committee treasurers